Norma Blum (born 1939) is a television, theatre and film actress and television presenter. She also works as a motivational therapist, having published several books.

Early life
Norma de Lacerda Blum was born in Rio de Janeiro, Brazil on 11 October 1939. She first worked in 1951, at the age of twelve, on the now defunct TV Tupi as script assistant to her father, who was responsible for translating texts to be transformed into television programmes. In 1954, she joined the permanent staff of TV Tupi actors, participating in several programmes, such as Teatro de Comédia, led by Maurício Sherman, Grande Teatro Tupi, directed by Sérgio Britto and Fernando Torres, and Teatrinho Troll, by Fábio Sabag. She was also in the cast of soap operas, such as A Canção de Bernadete (Bernadette's song), in the role of Our Lady of Lourdes. In addition to TV Tupi, Blum worked for TV Excelsior, TV Rio and TV Continental. In 1957, she participated in the New York Herald Tribune World Youth Forum and took part in a television show on the public broadcaster, WNET, in which she revealed that she spoke eight languages.

TV Globo
In 1964 Blum was invited to join the new TV Globo network. In her first job, she participated in the program Romance na Tarde, where she presented films and conducted interviews with actors and singers. She also participated in shows featuring Dercy Gonçalves and soap operas, such as A Gata de Mink in 1968. Along with Hilton Gomes, she led the presentation of Brazil's Festival Internacional da Canção (International Song Festival) in 1968 and in 1969. In 1975 she returned to TV Globo and starred in the soap opera, Senhora, written by Gilberto Braga and directed by Herval Rossano. She was subsequently in the cast of many TV Globo soap operas such as Bravo!, in 1975;  Elas por Elas, in 1982; Sinhá Moça (Little Missy), in 1986; and Lua Cheia de Amor (Moon full of love) in 1990. Her most famous soap opera roles were as Malvina, in Escrava Isaura (Slave girl Isaura), in 1976, and as  Frau Herta in Ciranda de Pedra, in 1981.

Resumption of career
In 1992, Blum decided to retire for health reasons. However, she resumed her career in 2003 in Pícara Sonhadora (The Mischievous Dreamer), an SBT production. In 2004 she appeared in a remake of Escrava Isaura. In 2011, she joined the cast of the soap opera by Gilberto Braga, Insensato Coração (Irrational Heart), on TV Globo. In addition to her television work, Blum appeared in 17 plays, between 1959 and 2003 and 17 films between 1956 and 2017. In 2020 she was working on a film about four 80-year-old women who had been schoolmates, when filming was interrupted by COVID-19.

Work as a therapist
Blum has worked in the area of self-transformation for several decades, giving motivational talks and participating in workshops. Her first publication on the topic was a self-help guide using Neuro-linguistic programming (NLP) techniques. This was followed by two pocketbooks designed to be used on a daily basis, and three stories for children.

Autobiography
In 2010, Blum published an autobiography, entitled Muitas Vidas: Vida e Carreira de Norma Blum (Many lives: Life and Career of Norma Blum).

References

1939 births
Living people
20th-century Brazilian actresses
21st-century Brazilian actresses
People from Rio de Janeiro (city)
Brazilian television actresses
Brazilian film actresses
Brazilian stage actresses